Fortnite Battle Royale is a free-to-play battle royale video game developed and published by Epic Games. It is a companion game to Fortnite: Save the World, a cooperative survival game with construction elements. It was initially released in early access on September 26, 2017, for Windows, macOS, PlayStation 4, and Xbox One, followed by ports for iOS, Android, and Nintendo Switch the following year. Epic dropped the early access label for the game on June 29, 2020. Versions for the PlayStation 5 and Xbox Series X/S were released as launch titles in late 2020.

The concept of the game is similar to previous games of the genre: 100 players skydive onto an island and scavenge for gear to defend themselves from other players. Players can fight alone, or with up to four other players. As the match progresses, the playable area within the island gradually constricts, giving the players less and less room to work with; outside this safe zone is "the Storm", which inflicts damage on those caught inside it, with the amount of damage growing as the Storm itself does. The last player or team alive wins the match. The main distinction from others in the genre is the game's construction elements, letting players build walls, obstacles, and other structures from collected resources to take cover from incoming fire or give one a strategic view advantage. Battle Royale uses a seasonal approach with battle passes to introduce new character customization content in the game, as well as limited-time events, some of which correspond with changes to the game map. Since its initial release, several other game modes have been introduced, including "Battle Lab" and "Party Royale".

The idea for Battle Royale arose following the release of PlayerUnknown's Battlegrounds in 2017, a similar battle royale game that was highly successful but noted for its technical flaws. Originally released as part of the early access version of Save the World, Epic later transitioned the game to a free-to-play model funded by microtransactions. Following its rise in popularity, Epic split the development team, with one focusing on Battle Royale and the other on Save the World.

Battle Royale received positive reviews from critics, who praised its learning curve, gameplay, art style, multiplayer and progression system, while receiving criticism regarding parental and security concerns. The game quickly rose in popularity following its release, eventually surpassing Battlegrounds in overall player count and revenue. Player count had exceeded 350 million by May 2020. The game has gone on to become a cultural phenomenon, with promotion through social media and several celebrities, such as Ninja, Marshmello, and Drake, contributing to the game's popularity, achieving record-high viewership on streaming platforms in the process.

Gameplay

The main gameplay for Fortnite Battle Royale follows the standard format for the battle royale genre. The game normally is played either with each player on their own, or in a squad of two to four players, with up to 100 players participating each round. The round starts with players, weaponless, skydiving from floating buses ("Battle Bus") then deploying a glider onto a region of land. The island's fixed layout includes several landmarks and locations (named in an alliterative fashion, such as "Lazy Lake", "Pleasant Park", and "Retail Row") that are mostly ghost towns during matches, while a random distribution of weapons, shields, and other combat support features can be found by searching chests scattered in buildings and other sites.

The primary goal is to be the last player or team alive by eliminating or avoiding other players. When playing in solo modes, players are immediately eliminated when they exhaust their health. In squad modes, downed players can crawl around while losing health; they can be eliminated immediately by an opponent or revived by a squadmate to help them up. Initially, when the game launched, eliminated players were out of the match, but starting with updates in April 2019, squadmates can attempt to respawn a downed player at various "Reboot vans" scattered around the map, which are few and far between and in the open, making it a risk to respawn a squadmate. Over time, the game's safe zone (representing the eye of a storm), decreases in size, and players caught outside the zone will take damage. This directs the surviving players into tighter spaces, forcing player encounters. Supply drops will spawn in random locations during a match, providing random weapons and items. Like in the original Fortnite game, Fortnite Battle Royale is primarily played in a third-person perspective.

Fortnite Battle Royales primary distinction from other battle royale games is the building system, which originated from the original Fortnite survival game. Nearly all objects in the environment can be destroyed and harvested for materials (wood, stone, and metal), which can then be used to build fortifications of limited durabilities, such as walls, ramps, floors, and roofs, which can be used to help traverse the map, protect the player from gunfire, or slow down progression of other players. Weaker pieces can be destroyed in a few hits, but can be built quickly, while stronger pieces can withstand more damage, but take longer to build. A special Zero Build game mode was introduced in March 2022 which eliminated all building aspects in the Battle Royale mode, and became a permanent secondary mode in the game by April 2022.

The game is free-to-play, supported by microtransactions that allow players to buy "V-Bucks," the game's internal currency. V-Bucks are also shared with the main Fortnite: Save the World game, which offers players the opportunity to earn V-Bucks by completing missions or daily quests. V-Bucks can then be used to buy cosmetic improvements to the player (outfits, pickaxes, gliders, backblings, and emotes). The game is run in chapters with a number of seasons, each season lasting about 10 weeks each. Each season introduces an exclusive set of cosmetic items that can be obtained. These are offered through a dual-track battle pass, which features a number of tiers that players climb through by earning experience through completing in-game objectives, while acquiring cosmetic rewards or other items in the process. Each player has access to the "free" track of the Battle Pass, which offers fewer cosmetics that can be earned by clearing multiple tiers, while players can also purchase the Pass' "premium" track with V-Bucks, which offers more challenges and grants prizes for every tier the player advances. Players can use V-Bucks to purchase tiers as well once they have bought the Battle Pass. Starting in December 2020, Epic added the "Fortnite Crew" monthly subscription plan; those on the plan gain access to the latest Battle Pass, a monthly allocation of V-Bucks, and access to exclusive cosmetics only available to subscribers.

Since release, Epic Games has added more features, such as new weapon and items and makeshift vehicles such as shopping carts and golf carts. Epic is also able to deploy hotfixes to the game to adjust aspects like weapon attributes and distribution, pushing these out in minutes if necessary should they or players discover critical issues or glitches, as well as removing older or not well received items from the game in a process called "vaulting". With the release of the standalone Fortnite Creative gameplay mode in December 2018, an area of the Fortnite Battle Royale map called "The Block" featured a rotating selection of user-made creations developed in Creative mode and approved by Epic. A "Battle Lab" mode was added in December 2019 for players to create their own custom battle royale games. In April 2020, a new "Party Royale" mode was added, taking place on a small map where combat and construction was disabled though non-lethal gameplay items can be acquired like paint guns and vehicles; this map was aimed to be used as a social space, as well as to host in-game events like concerts.

Prior to September 2019, Fortnite did not have specialized matchmaking, outside of platform and regional limits. With an upcoming patch, the game introduced skill-based matchmaking, based on internal metrics that judge a player's skill in the game. Further, with Chapter 2 Season 1, the game will add special matches against computer-controlled bots to help players practice the game.

Limited time and competitive modes
Epic has the ability to include limited-time modes (LTM) within the game, which provides Epic with experimental capabilities and gain feedback from players to improve upon. One of its earliest additions was a 50-v-50 mode, placing players randomly on one of two teams and dropping them on opposite sides of the map, giving the two teams time to gather resources, create fortifications, and hunt the other team before the storm moved in. A sandbox Playground LTM was introduced in June 2018, which allows up to four players to explore and build anything anywhere on the battle map, while being able to fight each other and respawn upon defeat until the storm covered the map after an hour and eliminated them all; Epic later made this a permanent mode in the game. 
Epic has stated that they intend to add ranked competitive play in the future. A preliminary competitive mode, Solo Showdown, ran for a limited time starting in May 2018, ranking players by their final placement in matches and rewarding the top-placing competitors with V-Bucks. Epics newest addition to the game, starting out Chapter 3 Season 2, was a temporary change called No-Building. This change removed all building mechanics in game. In exchange Epic added Over-Shield, giving each player 50 shield to start off with that would recharge throughout the game. Epic later turned this change into its own game mode, that would bring the building game mode back.

Fortnite released a new game mode called Zero Build on March 29, 2022. This game mode initially started out as a temporary change in Chapter 3 Season 2, to the main Battle Royale game mode. This change removed building completely, not allowing any option for a Building Game mode. Epic decided to then make this its own game mode due to its popularity. Epic brought back building on April 2, 2022, allowing for the option of either Building, or Zero Building choice of gameplay. This game mode features no building mechanics, making it less competitive to its successor. Epic added additional 50 Overshield when you start off, giving you the capacity of 250 health/shield total, to help supplement the change in game play. On April 10, 2022, Fortnite released the Zero Build Trials. Signing up for this, and completing the challenges, would allow players to be rewarded with in game rewards. On July 12, 2022, Epic released the first Zero Build Arena mode, a limited time game mode lasting until August 30, 2022. This game was initially released in Trios gameplay, only allowing you to have a total of 3 teammates. The Loot in the Arena mode is identical to the loot found in the Zero Build Mode.

Seasonal changes
Fortnite Battle Royale has created a larger loose narrative that is exhibited through changes in the game map, which generally correlated to the start and end of the in-game season. For example, in the lead up to the fourth season of the first chapter which started in May 2018, players saw a number of shooting stars cross the skies, followed by a giant comet that neared the ground; upon the start of that season, the comet had hit one of the locations on the map, leaving a giant crater, among other changes. This tied into several new cosmetic skins related to superheroes and super-villains that were available that month. Epic has the ability to create custom events that occur across all game servers simultaneously as well; the first example of such was a countdown leading to a giant rocket's launch in June 2018 which, in the aftermath, left cracks in the skies that have grown since that event.

The game initially launched without any seasonable schedule, but starting with the release of Chapter 1 Season 2 in December 2017, Epic has provided new content, which includes new cosmetics, new gameplay elements, and changes to the game's map, on a roughly 10-week basis. This also introduced the use of the battle pass for players to obtain some of this new content by completing challenges and gaining experience.

Chapter 1

Chapter 2

Chapter 3

Chapter 4

Promotional modes and elements
Shortly after the release of the film Avengers: Infinity War (2018), Epic ran a Marvel-sponsored event that featured the Infinity Gauntlet that randomly spawned on the map; any player that equipped it became Thanos with added abilities. A second Avengers-based mode was released upon the release of Avengers: Endgame (2019), where players are randomly split between Avenger and Chitauri armies, seeking out the Infinity Stones or the Infinity Gauntlet. Since then, other promotional content from other commercial properties, including cosmetic items and map features, has been available for limited periods in Fortnite, typically around the time of premieres or first broadcasts for these works. These commercial properties have included Ralph Breaks the Internet, John Wick, Stranger Things, Star Wars, Birds of Prey, The Matrix, Cobra Kai, among several others.

Non-gameplay related promotional events have included: 
EDM artist Marshmello held a virtual concert in the Pleasant Park location on February 2, 2019, across all game servers, estimated to have had over 10 million players watching it live. 
On December 14, a special preview of Star Wars: The Rise of Skywalker (2019) was released at the Risky Reels location, hosted by Geoff Keighley, which also featured the character of Emperor Palpatine in a voice segment that was referred to in the film's opening crawl. 
 Travis Scott performed a virtual "Astronomical" tour in support of his 2018 album Astroworld within Fortnite on multiple live concerts between April 23 and 25, 2020, including the premiere of a new song, "The Scotts", featuring Kid Cudi. The first performance on April 23 was estimated to have drawn over 12.3 million players to watch, while a total of 27.7 million unique viewers cumulatively watched the concerts. Along with these concerts, the event included a new cosmetics based on Scott for in-game purchase. Scott also Fortnite-inspired Cactus Jack products such as action figures and lunchboxes for the event.
 Diplo performed a live Major Lazer concert along with Jordan Fisher in the new "Party Royale" game mode on May 1, 2020, while a multi-part concert by Dillon Francis, Steve Aoki, and Deadmau5 was held on May 8 to celebrate the full release of the "Party Royale" game mode.
 A trailer for Christopher Nolan's Tenet (2020) was first shown in the "Party Royale" game mode before releasing to other digital services on May 21, 2020. In June 2020, Fortnite announced that it would livestream three Nolan films, Inception, Batman Begins, and The Prestige, depending on the region, through its "Movie Nite" event within "Party Royale". Epic Games partnered with Nolan and Warner Bros. to secure distribution rights in different languages and countries.
 BTS premiered their dance choreography music video for "Dynamite" in the "Party Royale" game mode on September 22, 2020.
J Balvin performed a live concert in the "Party Royale" game mode on October 31, 2020, premiering a new song titled "La Luz". Anyone who attended the concert could get a special J Balvin style for the Party Trooper outfit. The concert was recorded using extended reality (XR) technology.
 Epic launched a short animated film festival within the "Party Royale" mode in February 2021, called "Short Nite".
 Ariana Grande performed virtually as the headline act of the "Rift Tour" in August 2021.
 The Kid Laroi performed virtually at his concert "Wild Dreams" in January 2023.

Epic started a regular Fortnite Spotlight in-game concert event series in September 2020 using the "Party Royale" game mode, with such concerts from various musicians planned on a weekly basis and free for any player of Fortnite to watch. The musician will perform their set in a special studio set up by Epic that will be digitized in game. According to Nate Nanzer, Epic Games head of global partnerships, "We're creating this platform to work with artists — big artists and up-and-coming artists."

Development

Fortnite had first been revealed by Epic Games in 2011, considered to be a combination of Minecraft and Left 4 Dead as four players would work together to scavenge resources to build fortifications, traps, weapons, and other objects to survive monster attacks. The game ended up with a protracted development period, in part due to both external pressures, with the industry transitioning to a games as a service model, and internal shifts of focus within Epic (including focusing attention on their first free-to-play title Paragon) to meet the external challenges. During this period, Epic made a deal with Tencent, giving them about 40% of the company in exchange for their support for the games as a service approach as well as ready access to the Chinese video game market. Fortnite was confirmed to have a planned 2018 release in June 2017, with a paid early access period starting a month later; the game is planned otherwise as a free-to-play title supported by microtransactions. With release in early access, the game featured its primary gameplay mode, "Save the World", where players in teams up to four would work cooperatively to survive and complete objectives on randomly generated maps.

During the latter part of Fortnites development, PlayerUnknown's Battlegrounds was released in March 2017 on personal computers in early access, and quickly became a popular and successful game, becoming the defining example of the battle royale genre. According to Mustard, the Epic team "loved Battle Royale games like [Battlegrounds]", and explored how they could make a similar mode within Fortnites engine. They kept this mode in a separate development team from the main player versus environment modes for experimentation and as to not throw off the balance in the main game. The Battle Royale mode development was led by Eric Williamson with Zack Estep as production lead. Their goal was to develop the Battle Royale mode quickly from the core "Save the World" mode, putting off any complex features that weren't already in place as to launch the new mode as soon as possible; while they explored such potential ideas, they held off inclusion until after the main mode was launched. The development of the Battle Royale mode took about two months starting in July 2017 after the "Save the World" mode had shipped, and was aided by the Unreal Tournament team. Key differences for Battle Royale that differed from "Save the World" included a more limited progression for weapons, a small subset of traps, and a smoother, more natural terrain for the maps. They also wanted to aim for games not taking longer than 25 minutes, which led to some decisions of which elements from "Save the World" would not carry over. They had included Fortnites building mechanic for fortifications, not sure how players would use that since the safe zone would continue shrinking, but found quickly that the mechanic helped to distinguish the game from Battlegrounds and was used by expert players frequently to win matches, and had since implemented more features to help players with rapidly constructing temporary bases.

In those two months of development, Epic's plan was to include Battle Royale within the paid Fortnite game, and originally announced this approach publicly in early September 2017. Only two weeks before it was released did Epic decide to make it a separate free-to-play title, fearing that having it as part of the paid package would slow down the growth of the title. Epic announced this change formally about a week after first announcing Battle Royale, allowing those that had purchased early access to Fortnite in anticipation of this mode to request refunds. This release, which beat out Battlegrounds to consoles, caused some concern with Battlegrounds developer Bluehole, as they had been working closely with Epic for Unreal engine support in Battlegrounds, and were worried that Fortnite might be able to include planned features to their Battle Royale mode before they could release those in Battlegrounds.

With the popularity of Fortnite Battle Royale by the start of 2018, Epic split off a separate development team to focus on improvements for this mode. Epic said that their attention to Fortnite was causing some of their other games to see lower player populations, leading them to reduce development efforts on these games, particularly Paragon. By the end of January 2018, Epic announced it was shutting down Paragon by April of that year, providing refunds to all players. Similarly, Epic announced it had halted development of the planned free-to-play Unreal Tournament game, its team transitioned to Fortnite, though the game will remain available, playable, and open to end-user modifications. Players on a Fortnite-dedicated Reddit forum had expressed concerns that a similar fate could befall the Save the World mode of Fortnite, as externally, the Save the World mode has not received the same attention in providing updates and improvements compared to the Battle Royale mode since that mode's release.

According to Mustard, from the start of developing Fortnite Battle Royale, Epic had been interested in telling a narrative with the game, with a long-term narrative planned out by Mustard, but recognized the challenge when most players were focused on the base mechanics of the title. They decided to make players more as witnesses to the events rather than central characters, allowing the story to be told out through non-player characters that the players may encounter or through the game's additional media. This long-term narrative was designed to be flexible, accounting for both responses from players as well as for cross-promotions that Epic had secured over time, which had connected to the overall concept of a multiverse that is part of this narrative. Incorporating the narrative elements had led the development team to plan out new ways to include them, such as the single-time events across all servers, or specialized single-player missions.

On June 29, 2020, Epic announced that they considered Save the World to no longer be in early access, and as a companion move, eliminated the early access labels from both Battle Royale and Creative modes.

With the launch of Chapter 3 on December 5, 2021, Epic brought the game to use Unreal Engine 5.

Localization
Tencent, who is a partial owner of Epic Games, brought Fortnite Battle Royale to China in 2018; the company was already involved in supporting Battlegrounds in China as well. Epic also worked with Neowiz Games to bring a version of Fortnite to South Korea, launched in November 2018.

Tencent announced in October 2021 that the Chinese version of Fortnite, which had never left the beta phase and had a number of functional differences from international versions of the game, would be shutting down on November 15, 2021, disallowing new user registration. This move came after new regulations and restrictions made by the Chinese government towards online gaming.

Ports
A release of Fortnite for the Nintendo Switch video game console had been rumored in the week prior to the E3 2018 in June 2018. During the Nintendo Direct presentation, Nintendo and Epic Games announced the release of Fortnite Battle Royale for the Nintendo Switch, supporting cross-platform play with any other platform except the PlayStation 4; such users are able to carry over their inventory, Battle Pass status, and in-game currency between these platforms through their Epic user account. The game was released on June 12, 2018, the same day as the announcement. It is the first game to support direct voice chat through the Switch console through software provided by Vivox. With the success of the Switch version of Fortnite, Vivox had made its voice chat software development kit available for other Switch games.

In March 2018, Epic announced it was making Fortnite Battle Royale for Android and iOS mobile devices. The iOS version was released first, and was expected to be followed by the Android version by mid-2018. The beta version for iOS devices launched on March 15, 2018, and opened to all players on April 2, 2018. Epic Games stated that it was not possible to release the Android version with the iOS version simultaneously, and declined to provide a concrete release date for it, because the developers wanted to spend a few months making sure that the game will be compatible with as many Android devices as possible, a task that is not easily accomplished due to the high variety of Android hardware.

The Android beta version of Fortnite was released on August 9, 2018, with a time-exclusivity for selected Samsung mobile devices until August 12, 2018. On August 13, 2018, Epic began sending invites for the Android version to registered users for non-Samsung devices, and by October 11, 2018, the Android client was made available to all without an invite.

Until April 2020, the Android version was originally not distributed on Google Play Store: users had to sideload an installer app from an Android application package (APK) file downloaded from the Epic Games' website (although on Samsung devices, the app was also available via the internal Samsung Galaxy Apps service). Epic Games stated that it wanted to have a direct connection to the players of the game, and did not want its microtransactions to be subject to Google Play Store's 30% revenue sharing requirement (considering them disproportionate to the types of services the store provides). Epic had tried to seek an exemption from Google from this revenue cut for in-app purchases, but Google refused, stating the need for the fee to maintain and improve the Google Play storefront. Security experts expressed concern over this decision, since this requires users to modify security settings in default Android distributions to allow third-party sites to install Android application packages (APK). This setting can make users, particularly younger players, prone to potential malware, including clones of Fortnite that install malicious programming. About a month after the Android release, there were at least 32 clones of the Fortnite installer on the Google Store, with half found to include malware. Epic's installer for Android does include a warning message following the install that users should re-enable security controls and warns users of only downloading content from trusted sources. The initial installer was found by Google to have a potential vector that would allow for malware to be installed, though this was patched within 48 hours of discovery and Epic did not believe anyone used the vector. By April 2020, Epic announced it would release Fortnite for Android via the Play Store and discontinue its side-loading approach, stating that Google puts third-party software outside of the Play Store at a high disadvantage.

The iOS version of Fortnite Battle Royale alone brought in an estimated  in microtransaction revenue within the first three days of in-app purchases being available, according to analysis firm Sensor Tower.

Epic announced in May 2020 alongside its reveal of the upcoming Unreal Engine 5 that ports of Fortnite for the PlayStation 5 and Xbox Series X are planned to be available at the time of consoles' releases in late 2020. These will initially run on Unreal Engine 4, but the game is expected to transition to Unreal Engine 5 by mid-2021 when the engine is released. Fortnite finally moved to Unreal Engine 5 with the launch of Chapter 3 in December 2021.

Cross-platform play
For the first five seasons, all ports of Fortnite Battle Royale supported cross-platform play with other versions, but with limited interaction in regards to the PlayStation 4. Players on personal computer and mobile versions could cross-play with Xbox One and Nintendo Switch users, or alternatively they could cross-play with PlayStation 4 users. While Epic Games had expressed interest in having full cross-platform play across all available platforms, Sony's continued refusal to allow cross-play between the PlayStation 4 and other consoles rendered this impossible, according to Microsoft. Further, while players could use a single Epic Games account to share progress in Fortnite Battle Royale on all other platforms, those who used their PlayStation Network credentials to establish their Epic account cannot use that account on other platforms. The account restriction was confirmed to be as a result of Sony's initial decision to prohibit cross-platform play between its PlayStation 4 and other consoles, rather than a choice Epic had made.

By September 2018, Sony had made a decision to allow cross-platform play for the PlayStation 4 for "select third-party titles", starting with Fortnite. A beta version of the PlayStation 4 client supporting this was released for the game on September 26, 2018, the same day as Sony's announcement. Tools to merge multiple Epic accounts as well as unlinking console accounts from an Epic account to attach to another were released in February 2019. The first full patch adding in cross-platform play support across all consoles was released in March 2019.

Solo mobile players, or squads entirely consisting of mobile players will play solely with other mobile players by default for fairness; players however can use cross-platform play to join squads on other platforms, and matchmaking will consider all available matches. With the March 2019 for cross-platform play, the game will similar matchmake PlayStation 4 and Xbox One users by default to avoid these players being at a disadvantage against computer users.

Promotion and marketing
In May 2018, Epic announced a partnership with sports apparel manufacturing company IMG to produce official Fortnite-themed clothing. A Hasbro-licensed Fortnite Battle Royale-themed version of Monopoly was announced for release by late 2018; the Fortnite Monopoly game reflects some elements of the video game, such as the money being replaced with player's lives, and the ability to protect properties on the board with walls. Further, with this deal, Hasbro produced Fortnite-based Nerf blasters, which reached retail in 2019. Funko released a series of Fortnite themed Pop! figurines in late 2018.

Fortnite Battle Royale has been packaged as special bundles with both the Xbox One and Nintendo Switch, each version providing redeemable codes for V-bucks and platform-unique customization options. A retail release of Fortnite Battle Royale, called Fortnite: Deep Freeze Bundle, was distributed by Warner Bros. Interactive Entertainment for the PlayStation 4, Xbox One, and Nintendo Switch in late 2018. The package included a redeemable code for V-Bucks and unique in-game cosmetics.

In October 2018, Epic launched its "Support a Creator" program for Fortnite. Individual players could designate one of several popular Fortnite streamers, selected by Epic via an application process, to support via the game client. Though initially planned as a limited time event, Epic found by December 2018 that millions of Fortnite players were using the promotion to support more than 10,000 streamers, and since have made it a permanent option for Fortnite and hoping this would help some creators go full-time, and plans to extend this program to other games offered via the Epic Games Store, including Tom Clancy's The Division 2.

In November 2018, Epic partnered with the National Football League (NFL) to make character skins for each of the 32 teams in the league available to purchase for a limited time. This was the result of the influence of Fortnite on NFL players, who had frequently performed Fortnite dance emotes as touchdown celebrations.

Esports 

One of the first professional esports competitions using Fortnite was the Fortnite Pro-Am event, held on June 12, 2018, during E3 2018, with 3,000 in attendance. This tournament was announced after the success of the March 2018 stream by Ninja where he played alongside celebrities like Drake. Ninja and his celebrity teammate Marshmello were the winners of this event. Additional Pro-Am events were held at E3 2019 in June 2019.

In May 2018, Epic announced it was setting aside  to fund various tournaments throughout the year to help grow Fortnite Battle Royale into an eSport. The first Fortnite World Cup tournament was announced in February 2019, with qualifying rounds in April through June 2019, and the finals held at the Arthur Ashe Stadium in New York City from July 26–28, 2019.

The series had some initial problems; the first week event was cut short due to technical issues with game servers, while the second event ended with accusations of cheating towards the winner which Epic later verified were not true.

Starting with the game's tenth season in August 2019, Epic plans to run various Champion Series competitions for cash prizes. Each series is expected to have a different format, such as the first one slated to use squads of three. Each will have a number of qualifying weeks and a final tournament to determine winners across several geographic regions.

Through PlayVS, Epic will sponsor high school and college-level Fortnite tournaments in the United States starting in 2020.

Other media
Epic and DC Comics partnered for a six-issue comic book crossover series, Batman/Fortnite: Zero Point, to start distribution in April 2021. The story is written by Christos Gage in collaboration with Epic's Donald Mustard. Each issue will include codes to unlock in-game items for Fortnite with a Batman outfit code available with purchase of all six books.

In another collaboration between Epic and DC, Batman/Fortnite: Zero Point received a sequel in October 2021, a standalone comic titled: Batman/Fortnite: Foundation. It also had a redeemable code to claim a The Batman Who Laughs outfit.

Reception and legacy

Player count and revenue

Fortnite Battle Royale received generally positive reviews on all platforms. Daniel Tack of Game Informer gave the game 9.5/10 and praised the "stylish and colorful visuals", "incredibly easy" playability, high replayability and called it an "a frenzy of fresh, fantastical fun". Michael Higham of Gamespot gave the game 8/10 and praised the "intuitive" building mechanics, "unexpected" challenges, "fresh" updates, though criticized its repetitive resource-gathering and map traversal and "bare" main towns. Austen Golsin of IGN gave the game 9.6/10 and stated, "Thanks to the freedom of its outstanding building mechanic, Fortnite Battle Royale isn't just a great battle royale game – it's one of the best multiplayer games in recent history."

Fortnite Battle Royale has become a phenomenon and has been compared by analysts to World of Warcraft and Minecraft for successfully drawing in people who do not usually play video games. Fortnite Battle Royale obtained over 10 million players two weeks after its release. By March 2018, it was estimated to have more than 45 million players. Three months later, in June 2018, Epic announced they had achieved over 125 million players in less than a year, with at least 40 million players playing the game once per month. In November 2018, Bloomberg reported that Fortnite had over 200 million registered accounts across all platforms. Epic CEO Tim Sweeney reported that the game had reached 250 million players by the time of the 2019 Game Developers Conference, with an estimated 35% of those players being female, the highest known percentage for any shooter game. By May 2020, Epic stated the game had over 350 million registered players. In August 2020, a legal battle between Apple and Epic Games disclosed that Fortnite has over 25 million daily active users, including 10% DAU on iOS. By the end of the year, Fortnite as a whole (including Fortnite Battle Royale) had generated over  worldwide.

Individual platform releases saw initial surges in player counts. Within a day of becoming available, the Nintendo Switch version had been downloaded over 2 million times, according to Nintendo. Epic said that Fortnite had been downloaded over 15 million times for Android within three weeks of its launch. On the release of Season 5 in July 2018, Akamai Technologies reported that Fortnite traffic neared 37 terabytes per second, the largest recorded amount of traffic for any video game that they have observed. With its quarterly financial report ending September 30, 2018, Nintendo said that Fortnite Battle Royale had been downloaded on about half of all Switch systems they have sold, representing about 11.5 million downloads.

Fortnite Battle Royale was made available to South Korea and their numerous PC bangs in November 2018; shortly after this point, Epic reported that Fortnite has surpassed a concurrent player count of 8.3 million, surpassing the game's previous record of 3.4 million in February 2018.

SuperData estimated Fortnites revenues over all platforms to exceed  for the month of March. By April 2018, SuperData estimated that Fortnite Battle Royale had surpassed both sales and player count on all platforms over Battlegrounds.

At the time of Tencent's investment into Epic in 2012, Epic Games had a  valuation. Partially due to the influx of revenue from Fortnite Battle Royale, Epic reduced its portion of sales it collected from the Unreal Engine Marketplace from 30% to 12% in July 2018, applying that retroactively to past sales.

Viewership
Fortnite Battle Royale has also had record viewership on various streaming services. One of the first major streams of Fortnite was in March 2018, in which Tyler "Ninja" Blevins hosted a stream that included Drake, Travis Scott, Kim DotCom, and Pittsburgh Steelers wide receiver JuJu Smith-Schuster all playing the game. The stream broke over 635,000 concurrent viewers, making it the highest-watched stream on Twitch outside of esports tournaments at the time. YouTube streamer Rubén Doblas Gundersen held a Fortnite Battle Royale match with 99 other well-known YouTube streamers in late March, which drew over 1.1 million viewers, making it one of the most-watched gaming YouTube streams. The Fortnite Pro-Am event held at E3 2018 was estimated to have drawn over 1.3 million views across Twitch and other streaming services, making it one of the highest-viewed live-streamed event to date.

Further live events set by Epic have continued to draw record numbers of stream viewers. The 2019 Fortnite World Cup drew 1.5 million viewers, while "The End" event that closed out Season X in October 2019 had 1.6 million. Even after the conclusion of the event, during the 36-hour period that the Fortnite game only showed a black screen with a spot of light on it, Fortnite streams had up to 327,000 viewers on Twitch and 437,000 viewers on YouTube watching the idle animation. Epic reported that over 7 million total viewers across Twitch, YouTube, and Twitter across "The End" event. The Chapter 2, Season 2 ending event in June 2020 had drawn 12 million in-game players with an additional 8.4 million watching through player streams. The single largest viewed in-game concert was the Travis Scott in-game concert in April 2020, which drew 12.3 million in-game players to watch. The single largest viewed-in game event was the Devourer of Worlds Event, which brought 15.3 million in-game players and an additional 3.4 million people watching through streams.

Impact

Journalists attributed Fortnite Battle Royales success over PlayerUnknown Battlegrounds as a combination of several factors: besides being free-to-play and available on consoles, the game was released at a time when Battlegrounds was struggling with game cheaters and a toxic community, and that it features a less violent, cartoonish quality to it that, like Minecraft, was able to draw in a younger and mixed-gendered audiences to play. Further, Epic has maintained frequent updates for the game, adding new weapons and in-game tools alongside limited-time events and longer-term narrative elements that help to further draw in players. The high interest in the game within March 2018, which has been able to draw larger audiences compared to existing multiplayer games like Grand Theft Auto Online and Destiny 2, has had a financial impact on competing publishers Take-Two Interactive and Activision Blizzard, their stocks having fallen during this period, according to analysts from Morgan Stanley and KeyBanc Capital Markets Inc. Activision's CEO Bobby Kotick, on their quarterly results released May 2018, stated that "Fortnite is definitely a lot of competition right now...it's been a really important catalyst in attracting new gamers to gaming", and the company is looking to develop its own battle royale title. Electronic Arts CEO Blake Jorgensen also considered both Fortnite Battle Royale and Battlegrounds as having a significant market impact. Jorgensen said " [Fortnite is] bringing younger people into the marketplace and younger people into first-person shooters, and I think that's good for the long run health of that category for all of us in the industry". Non-video game entertainment companies have also seen the impact of Fortnite. Netflix, in reporting its Q4 2018 results, stated that their competition is more with Fortnite, including streaming content related to the game, rather than rival television network stations like HBO.

Part of the game's success is also considered to be related to its impact on social media. By March 2018, Fortnite Battle Royale became the most-viewed game on Twitch, exceeding the average-concurrent viewership numbers of League of Legends and Battlegrounds. Blevins has gained significant attention as one of the first major Fortnite Battle Royale streamers. He gained a large number of subscribers by March 2018, in part due to his skill and through promotions on Twitch that offered free Fortnite Battle Royale cosmetic items; by March 2018, he was estimated to be making  a month from his streaming revenue. For his success from Fortnite, Time included Blevins within its Time 100 most influential people of 2019. To acknowledge individuals like Blevins that had helped grow the popularity of Fortnite, Epic has released a number of in-game cosmetics under the "Icon Series" based on the real-life people; in addition to Blevins, cosmetics were released for musicians Marshmello and Major Lazer, and the streamer Loserfruit, with a planned release of cosmetics related to David "Grefg" Martínez.
 

A number of celebrities and athletes have said they play Fortnite Battle Royale, such as Chance the Rapper, Joe Jonas, Finn Wolfhard, Roseanne Barr, and Norm Macdonald. For athletes, their appreciation for the game has taken on the form of recreating the various emotes in game as part of their on-field celebration dances. Such Fortnite celebrations were frequently throughout the 2018 FIFA World Cup event in June and July 2018, including by Antoine Griezmann after a scoring penalty kick during the 2018 FIFA World Cup Final. Other notable people have expressed their fondness for the game; the Russo brothers, directors of Avengers: Infinity War, stated that they often played Fortnite Battle Royale during breaks on the film's development, leading them to propose the idea of the Thanos LTM for the game. The Russo brothers also co-directed the introduction cinematic for Chapter 2 Season 6 that was released in March 2021. The awareness of the game from well-known celebrities has been considered a reason for further popularity and player growth of the game.

In popular culture
Fortnite Battle Royale has been jokingly referred to as "Fork Knife" on social media, believed to have originated with people, unfamiliar with the game, described their friends and family spending time playing the game. Epic added a harvestable, non-playable "Fork Knife" food truck to the game map as the term gained popularity. In September 2018, Fortnite was featured as a question on the game show Jeopardy!, and was spoofed in a skit on the September 29, 2018, episode of Saturday Night Live. The South Park episode "The Scoots" featured the cast wearing Fortnite-based Halloween costumes. In The Big Bang Theory episode "The Citation Negation", Bernadette attempts to learn how to play Fortnite Battle Royale to beat Howard. Fortnite also makes an easter egg appearance in the Disney animated film Ralph Breaks the Internet. The game was also a central focal point in the 2018 YouTube Rewind year retrospective, and included an appearance by the popular Fortnite streamer Ninja.

In addition to there being a tie-in LTM for Avengers: Endgame, Fortnite conversely appears in the film, in which it is played by Korg in New Asgard, a village inhabited by Asgardian refugees recuperating from the devastating events of Thor: Ragnarok and Avengers: Infinity War.

Past and ongoing concerns

Parental concerns
With the release of the mobile version, teachers, parents, and students have found that the game had become popular to younger players due to the free-to-play nature, its cartoonish art style, and its social nature. This carries over into educational institutions, where the game has been seen as a disruptive element within the classroom and affecting students' ability to complete homework assignments. Epic has since added warnings on the game's loading screens to discourage students from playing it during classes. The UK's Secretary of State for Digital, Culture, Media and Sport at the time Matt Hancock, expressed concern at how much time children were playing Fortnite Battle Royale and similar video games without a balance of physical exercise and social interactions. Other agencies, including the United States' Center on Media and Child Health and the United Kingdom's National Society for the Prevention of Cruelty to Children have cautioned parents that children may be influenced by the violent behavior due to Fortnite Battle Royale. Prince Harry, speaking about various influences of social media on children in April 2019, proposed a possible ban on Fortnite Battle Royale, saying, "The game shouldn't be allowed", and "It's created to addict. An addiction to keep you in front of a computer for as long as possible. It's so irresponsible." Calex Legal, a Montreal law firm, filed a class-action lawsuit against Epic Games asserting that Epic has known the game is addictive but fail to give this warning to players. Calex's suit was allowed to proceed in December 2022 after both a Superior Court and the Supreme Court of Canada affirmed the lawsuit was not frivolous. A separate class-action suit filed in California in February 2021 asserts that Epic knowingly "misleads and manipulates minors into handing over ever-increasing amounts of real money for virtual things" through its V-bucks system.

At the same time, parents have expressed appreciation for Fortnite to have their children engage socially outside of their core groups of friends in a game that is otherwise not excessively violent, or see offering Fortnite as a reward for encouraging children to do well in school, offering their children the purchase of V-bucks in exchange for good grades. Some parents see potential in their children becoming skilled in Fortnite as to become professional players and compete for part of the large prize pools, creating a market for tutors to help children improve their skills in the game. At the same time, as Fortnite Battle Royale became a social hangout for younger players, issues of peer pressure and bullying have been raised. Cosmetic skins are seen as a sign of skill and status, so younger players spend money to get the rarer skins to appear equal with their friends, or may be taunted by other players for not having such skins and using the game's "default" skins. While Fortnite has been successful in its monetization scheme, this approach using battle passes and rotating skin availability induces players to continue to spend money in a "Keeping up with the Joneses"-type effect.

Other issues related to children's interest in Fortnite have been raised. Several of the security issues raised around the game are heightened with younger players who may not easily recognize such illicit schemes and put themselves at risk to privacy invasion. There is some concern that online child sexual predators would be able to easily make contact with underage players, with at least one documented case from Florida.

Security issues 
Fortnites popularity has drawn a network of hackers since March 2018 that target accounts with lucrative skins and emotes as to resell those accounts to other users. Some of those hackers, speaking anonymously to the BBC, stated they were making thousands of British pounds a week through these actions. Authorities that monitor the dark web have found that Fortnite Battle Royale has become a popular way to engage in credit card fraud: criminals with access to stolen credit card information use that to purchase V-bucks on a freshly-made Fortnite account when they then sell through services like eBay players at a discount, often preying on children and young adults with these schemes.

Separately, other security experts such as Check Point have found exploits with Fortnite and its underlying services that allowed hackers to gain access to some accounts, enabling them to gain personal details, buy V-bucks, and listen in to the account's owner when they use the game's voice chat system. Epic closed a key exploit that enabled this by January 2019. A class-action lawsuit was filed in August 2019 over this breach, acknowledging while Epic did fix the problem, it failed to notified the users that were affected by it.

Epic has taken action against players that have used in-game hacks, like aimbots, to gain a competitive edge when these are discovered. In one notable case, Jarvis Khattri, a member of FaZe Clan, was given a lifetime Fortnite ban in November 2019 after he had posted a video which showed how aimbots within Fortnite worked, despite having cautioned his viewers to not use aimbots nor providing details of how to acquire the aimbot. The ban was controversial as Khattri had developed his esports career on Fortnite, and FaZe Clan had started discussions with Epic Games to reduce the ban in context of the video clip.

Dance emotes lawsuits
The popularity of Fortnites dance emotes, which borrow from dance moves in popular culture, have led the creators of these dances to express concern and take legal action about these moves being sold by Epic, even though the United States Copyright Office had issued statements that individual dance moves are uncopyrightable. These include rapper 2 Milly regarding his "Milly Rock", and actor Donald Faison related to a dance move he used on the TV show Scrubs. 2 Milly has started taking legal action against Epic with copyright infringement over the "Milly Rock"-based dance emote as well as asserting claims against personality rights under California law. Actor Alfonso Ribeiro filed a similar suit against Epic for their "Fresh" emote dance, which Ribeiro says was directly based on his character Carlton Banks' dance from The Fresh Prince of Bel-Air. "Backpack Kid" Russell Horning, whose dance move the Floss was popularized through live performance with Katy Perry, has also initiated legal action against Epic for copyright infringement of his dance. Another lawsuit by the parent of the child that created a popular "Orange Shirt Kid" dance has also filed a lawsuit against Epic on similar grounds; in this case, while the child had submitted the dance for an Epic-run contest for a new Fortnite dance emote, he did not win, but fans petitioned Epic to include the dance anyway. The lawsuit challenges that the child was not recognized or compensated for the dance move. BlocBoy JB filed another suit against Epic over his "Shoot" dance move, represented by the in-game "Hype" emote, by late January 2019. Jared Nickens and Jaylen Brantley filed a lawsuit against Epic in February 2019, seeking  in damages for Epic's use of their "Running Man" dance.

In at least one of these cases, that from 2 Milly, Epic is seeking the suit to be dismissed claiming that a simple dance move cannot be copyrighted, according to guidance issued by the United States Copyright Office.

In March 2019, the Supreme Court of the United States ruled in Fourth Estate Public Benefit Corp. v. Wall-Street.com, an unrelated case, that a copyright infringement lawsuit cannot commence until the Copyright office registered the copyright. As the Copyright office has refused to register some of these dance emotes as copyrights, four of the six pending suits (2 Milly, Ribeiro, Backpack Kid and Orange Shirt Kid) were withdrawn within a few days. The firm that represented the four cases, Pierce Bainbridge Beck Price & Hect, stated this was merely a procedural withdrawal until they completed the registrations with the Copyright office.

A seventh suit was filed by Leo Pellegrino, a saxophone player known for his dances during his performances. Unlike previous cases, Pellegrino's case accuses Epic Games of misappropriation of his trademarked likeness over an in-game emote that has a player's character dance while playing a saxophone, rather than any specific dance move. A federal district judge ruled in March 2020 that Fortnite sufficiently transforms Pellegrino's move from his overall likeness to qualify for First Amendment protections, and summarily ruled against all but one of Pellegrino's other claims. The claim of false endorsement was allowed to remain but still will be reviewed by the courts.

After receiving a complaint from comedian Matt Geiler over a combination of a dance emote and cosmetic skin that he claimed infringe on his character of the "Dancing Pumpkin Man", Epic preemptively filed a request to the courts in December 2019 to rule that their emote and cosmetics do not infringe on Geiler's trademark or copyright.

Since then, Epic had worked with a dance creator to work the dance emote into the game, such as with musician Rick Astley to add a dance based on his song "Never Gonna Give You Up" (commonly associated with rickrolling).

Similar suits have been filed against the same dance moves used in 2K Games' NBA 2K games, while the offending dance moves were removed in January 2019 from the game Forza Horizon 4, though it is unknown if this was due to legal action. In the lawsuit involving Ribeiro's dance, the Copyright Office had refused to grant Ribeiro a copyright for the dance, not only because they considered it a "simple dance routine", but also because Ribeiro had created the dance in context of another copyrighted work, so he would likely be unable to claim ownership.

Apple and Google lawsuits
On August 13, 2020, Epic announced it was permanently discounting the price of V-bucks across all platforms by 20%, except for those purchased directly through the iOS App Store and Google Play storefronts. For the mobile platforms, Epic created its own purchasing option that allowed players to purchase directly from Epic bypassing Apple and Google. Epic said that they could not offer this discount to those purchasing through Apple or Google's storefronts due to the 30% fee both took from each sale, which was seen by journalists as yet another means to challenge the 30% fee. Later that day, both Apple and Google removed Fortnite from their stores, both claiming that the payment system violates the store terms. The removals prevent players from downloading the game but not playing it if they already own it. The game still remained available on the Samsung Galaxy Store for Samsung devices as well as directly from Epic Games via their sideloaded app for all Android devices.

Epic immediately filed a lawsuit against Apple over "unfair and anti-competitive actions", along with releasing a short "Nineteen Eighty-Fortnite" parodying Apple's "1984" advertisement to explain the reasonings for filing the lawsuit. Epic filed a similar lawsuit against Google the same day.

While the game remained playable for users that previously downloaded it, its removal from the iOS App Store left Epic the inability to update the game, which it used to caution players on social media that they will miss out on the upcoming new season starting August 27; Epic also cautioned macOS similarly that they would be unable to update their version as well. Epic was denied a preliminary injunction on August 24, 2020, that would have forced Apple to keep the game on the App Store, thus leaving the game unable to update on iOS. Epic had also believed that Apple was terminating the ability for users with Epic account linked through Apple to log in using their Apple ID by September 11, 2020, but Apple confirmed they would not be disabling this feature. Following the trial in May 2021, the federal judge issued a first ruling in September 2021 that included a permanent injunction against Apple that prevented from blocking developers like Epic from including links to alternative payment systems for apps on the App Store.

BBC reported in November 2020 that Epic had worked a deal with Nvidia as to allow iOS players to play Fortnite through the GeForce Now cloud gaming service running within a browser, the method which would bypass the requirement for Epic to require Apple to manage the in-game purchases. The browser-based GeForce Now client for iOS was released by November 19, 2020, with Fortnite to be added at a later time. On May 5, 2022, Microsoft released their Cloud based gaming service, the second workaround to the Mobile platform issue. Anyone with a free Microsoft account can login in and access Fortnite via their mobile devices.

Other legal issues 
In January 2018, Bluehole's PUBG Corp., the South Korean company behind PlayerUnknown's Battlegrounds (PUBG), filed a lawsuit against Epic Games, claiming that Fortnite Battle Royale was a copyright infringement of Battlegrounds; they accused Epic Games of copying PUBGs user interface and game items. According to Korea Times, market observers predicted that there would be little likelihood of Bluehole winning the case, as it would be difficult to establish the originality of PUBG in court due to the battle royale game genre, which includes both PUBG and Fortnite Battle Royale, being derived from the 2000 Japanese film Battle Royale. The case has since closed, with PUBG Corp. dropping the lawsuit in June 2018 under undisclosed reasons.

Epic has taken legal action against persons that have signed non-disclosure agreements (NDAs) in regards to leaking information about upcoming game information. In May 2018, Epic Games filed a lawsuit against quality assurance tester Thomas Hannah after he leaked information regarding Season 4. Hannah, who had joined Epic in December 2017, breached the NDA by sharing details of the Season with Adam DiMarco. DiMarco later shared information in a Reddit post, spoiling the theme of the Season. Epic stated that Hannah "diminished the enjoyment of the people who play, or who watch others play, Fortnite by ruining the suspense that had been building in the Fortnite community in anticipation of upcoming season". Epic also sent FNBRLeaks, a group that datamined the files Fortnite to determine new features and events that were likely coming in the near future, a cease & desist letter in December 2018, stating that their reporting of these upcoming features were negatively harming Epic and spoiling the game for the players. FNBRLeaks complied with the terms of the letter. Epic initiated a lawsuit in October 2019 against a Fortnite experience tester that leaked details of the Chapter 2 transition days before the event occurred, which included details of the map and mechanics, stating the tester broke confidentiality agreements. Epic filed a second similar lawsuit in November 2019 against a tester out of Keywords Studio in Montreal over similar Chapter 2 leaks that were in breach of the terms of their non-disclosure agreement.

Epic has also taken action against players who have profited by profiting cheats to other players in Fortnite. These suits include:
 In October 2017, Epic Games filed civil complaints against two associates of the website Addicted Cheats, which for a payment provided cheating services to players. The company argued that the two defendants made and used altered game breaking code that was against the End User License Agreement and the Copyright Act.
 Epic filed suit against a minor in 2017 who had used cheats in game and advertised these cheats in their YouTube channel videos. The case was ultimately settled out of court by February 2021 with undisclosed terms.
 In October 2018, Epic Games sued YouTuber Brandon Lucas, who posts videos on the channel, Golden Modz. The lawsuit details that Lucas, cheats at the game and "promotes, advertises and sells software that enables those who use it to cheat." The lawsuit also names Lucas's secondary website in which visitors are encouraged to purchase the hack and/or Fortnite user accounts preloaded with hacks.

The company that oversees the Coral Castle structure in Miami-Dade County, Florida filed a lawsuit against Epic Games in August 2020, on trademark infringement over use of the name "Coral Castle" associated with the location the game introduced in Chapter 2, Season 3. The suit contends that the name along with the nautical theme created confusion with their landmark.

Notes

References

Further reading

External links
 
 

2017 video games
Android (operating system) games
Battle royale games
Early access video games
Epic Games games
Esports games
Battle Royale
Free-to-play video games
iOS games
MacOS games
Nintendo Switch games
PlayStation 4 games
PlayStation 4 Pro enhanced games
PlayStation 5 games
PlayStation Network games
Third-person shooters
Unreal Engine games
Video games containing battle passes
Video games developed in the United States
Video games set on fictional islands
Video games with cross-platform play
Windows games
Xbox One games
Xbox One X enhanced games
Xbox Series X and Series S games
YouTube sponsors
Golden Joystick Award for Game of the Year winners